Guy Bolagh (also Romanized as Gūy Bolāgh) is a village in Akhtarabad Rural District, in the Central District of Malard County, Tehran Province, Iran. At the 2006 census, its population was 147, in 28 families.

References 

Populated places in Malard County